Colonel Ebirt was the unofficial school mascot for the College of William & Mary from 2001 to 2005. A green and gold frog that donned a tri-corner hat, Colonel Ebirt was originally used as a promotional tool for Colonial Williamsburg. It became involved with the College athletics program when someone from the William & Mary gymnastics program volunteered to wear the costume. "Ebirt" is Tribe spelled backwards ("ebirt" is analogous to the more commonly heard frog call "ribit"), and "Colonel" comes from the school's historical and geographical ties to Williamsburg, Virginia, specifically that of Colonial Williamsburg.

The athletic department decided to "retire" Ebirt upon the conclusion of the 2005–06 school year. On April 6, 2010, William and Mary announced that a griffin was to become their official mascot, replacing Ebirt.

See also
 Griffin – William & Mary's mascot successor to Colonel Ebirt
 List of U.S. college mascots

References and notes

External links
Interview with the Colonel Ebirt costume wearers

William & Mary Tribe
Former college mascots in the United States
Mascots introduced in 2001
Frog mascots